Mouhoun is one of the 45 provinces of Burkina Faso. It is in the Boucle du Mouhoun region. The capital of Mouhoun is Dédougou.

Education
In 2011 the province had 210 primary schools and 34 secondary schools.

Healthcare
In 2011 the province had 27 health and social promotion centers (Centres de santé et de promotion sociale), 7 doctors and 151 nurses.

Demographics
Most people in the province live in rural areas; 260,295 Burkinabé live in the countryside with only 37,793 people residing in urban areas. There are 148,732 men living in Mouhoun Province and 149,356 women (2006 census).

Departments
Mouhoun is divided into 7 departments:

See also
Regions of Burkina Faso
Provinces of Burkina Faso
Departments of Burkina Faso

References

 
Provinces of Burkina Faso